Sierra Leone Ministry of Finance is a ministerial department of the Government of Sierra Leone, and is in charge of managing the revenue and finances of the Sierra Leone government. The ministry implements the Sierra Leone government economic policies and public financial management. The ministry advises the President of Sierra Leone on economic issues. The headquarter of the Sierra Leone Ministry Of Finance is located on George Street in Freetown, Sierra Leone.

The  Ministry of Finance  is headed by the Minister of Finance, who is appointed by the president of Sierra Leone, and must be confirmed by the Parliament of Sierra Leone before taking office. The current Sierra Leone Minister of Finance is Sheku Ahmed Fantamadi Bangura, who was previously Deputy Finance Minister. The President of Sierra Leone has the constitutional authority to sack the Minister of Finance at any time.

Responsibilities
The responsibilities of the Sierra Leone Ministry of Finance include:
Manages the country's revenue and finances
Implement the Sierra Leone Government economic policies and public finances
Ensure efficient allocation of public resources to promote stable economic growth 
Advises the President and the Government of Sierra Leone on economic issues
Collecting the Sierra Leone Government taxes 
Releases data about the country's economy
Enforcing Tax laws 
Manages the country's debts
Pay debts and loans of the government
Pay government bills
Allocating finances of departments within the Sierra Leone government
Manages and supervises all national banks owned by the Sierra Leone Government
Set up rules and regulations of all private banks in Sierra Leone
Ensure the correct, timely and accurate payment of monthly salaries to the President of Sierra Leone, the Vice President of Sierra Leone and members of the Sierra Leone Parliament
Receives money deposited in the Sierra Leone Government treasury
Edit finances of departments of the Sierra Leone
Print out paper bills and mint coins of the currency of Sierra Leone
Gives approved financial loan from national banks owned by the Sierra Leone Government

Ministers of Finance
Mohammad Sanusi Mustapha, 1961-?
Albert Michael Margai, 1962-1964
Robert Granville Ojumiri King, 1964-1967
Andrew Juxon-Smith, 1967
Shecku B. Daramy, 1967-1968
Mohamed Sorie Forna, 1968-1970
Christian Alusine Kamara-Taylor, 1971-1975
Sorie Ibrahim Koroma, 1975-1977
Abu Bakar Kamara, 1977-1978
Francis Minah, 1978-1981
Sama Banya, Jan 1981 - Dec 1981
Siaka Stevens, Dec 1981-1982
Salia Jusu-Sheriff, May 1982- Sept 1984
Abdulai Conteh, 1984-1985
Joe Amara Bangali, 1985
Sheka Kanu, 1985-1987
Hassan Gbassay Kanu, 1987-1989
Tommy Taylor-Morgan, 1989-1991
James S. A. Funna, 1991-1992
Jim Fornah, 1992-1993
John Karimu, 1993-1996
Samura Kamara, January 1996 - March 1996
Thaimu Bangura, March 1996 - May 1997
Joe Amara Bangali, May 1997 - 1998
James O. C. Jonah, April 1998 - February 2001
Peter Jiwa Kuyembeh, February 2001 - May 2002
Joseph B. Dauda, May 2002 - September 2002
John Oponjo Benjamin, September 2002 - September 2007
David Carew, September 2007 - February 2009
Samura Kamara, February 2009 - January 2013
Kaifala Marah, January 2013 - March 2016
Momodu Kargbo, March 2016 - April 2018
Jacob Jusu Saffa, April 2018- May 2021 
Dennis Vandi, May 2021 - January 2023
Sheku Ahmed Fantamadi Bangura, January 2023 -

See also 
 Bank of Sierra Leone
 Finance ministry
 Economy of Sierra Leone
 Politics of Sierra Leone

References

External links
 Sierra Leone - Ministry of Finance and Economic Development, MOFED

Government of Sierra Leone
Finance
Sierra Leone
1961 establishments in Sierra Leone